Lacanobia altyntaghi is a moth of the Noctuoidea family. It is found in Altyn-Tagh, China.

References 

Lacanobia
Moths described in 1998